Alpine everlasting is a common name for several plants and may refer to:

Antennaria alpina, native to Europe and North America
Ozothamnus alpinus, native to Australia
Xerochrysum subundulatum, native to Australia